This painting's Spanish title "La Aguadora" has various translations in English, The Water Bearer, Young Woman with a Pitcher, or the Water Carrier.
It is an oil on canvas painting by Francisco de Goya, now in the Museum of Fine Arts in Budapest.

After a long period producing tapestry cartoons for the royal factory, where his works conformed to the court's rococo style, Goya started painting genre scenes.  Works such as The Water Bearer, featuring working-class people, can be seen in the context of the Spanish resistance to French occupation in the War of Independence.

The art historian Juliet Wilson-Bareau has suggested that this work and its companion piece The Knifegrinder were painted to hang in the painter's house in Madrid. It was still in his possession in 1812.

It was acquired by Alois Wenzel von Kaunitz-Rietberg, who served as the Austrian ambassador to Spain 1815-17.

See also
List of works by Francisco Goya

References

Bibliography
 Kazimierz Zawanowski, Francisco Goya y Lucientes, Varsovie, Arkady (W kręgu sztuki), 1975
 Robert Hughes, Goya. Artysta i jego czas, Varsovie, WAB, 2006 (OCLC 569990350), p. 248, et 76
 Francisco Goya, Poznań, Oxford Educational, 2006
 María Jesús Díaz (ed.), Goya, Madrid, Susaeta Ediciones, 2010, p. 191
 Clara Janés, Los genios de la pintura española: Goya, Madrid, SARPE, 1983, p. 93

External links

Paintings by Francisco Goya
1810s paintings
Paintings in the collection of the Museum of Fine Arts (Budapest)